OzAsia Festival, or simply OzAsia, is an Asia-focused arts festival in South Australia, presented by the Adelaide Festival Centre for two weeks in late October to early November each year. It features theatre, dance, music, film and visual arts from across Asia as well as outdoor events and food stalls. In some years it has focused on specific regions or countries in Asia.

Since 2017, the festival has included the Lucky Dumpling Market, comprising numerous food stalls set up along the river bank. From 2018 to 2020, the event included JLF Adelaide, an offshoot of the Jaipur Literary Festival, and in 2021 OzAsia Festival presented In Other Words, a digital and in-person literature festival.

History
After the Government of South Australia wiped a -million debt from Adelaide's Festival Centre in the 2005–2006 State Budget, the Festival Centre began a five-year financial rebuilding programme. OzAsia Festival resulted from the Government of South Australia and the Adelaide Festival Centre partnering in 2007 to create a new arts festival of national and cultural significance, and was one of several ideas to revive the Adelaide Festival Centre. 

The inaugural OzAsia Festival was held 21 September–7 October 2007, and stood on two key guiding principles: the contribution of Australian artists and performers who identify with an Asian cultural heritage and the constant stream of collaboration between Australia and its regional neighbours. Its program was built on four key pillars: performing arts, visual arts, cultural debate, and community involvement.

The first OzAsia Festival program was produced by Executive Director, Nick Skibinski, who was succeeded by Jacinta Thompson as Festival Director the following year. From 2010 – 2015, the festival undertook a country of focus initiative, each year emphasising a particular country to grow stronger cultural ties between Australia and key countries in the region. 2010 it was Korea; 2011, Japan; 2012, India; 2013, Malaysia; and 2014, Thompson's last program, China.

In 2015, Joseph Mitchell became the OzAsia Festival Artistic Director. He shifted the program rationale from focussing on a single country each year to instead showcase the best contemporary art and artists from across Asia, including the Middle East (Western Asia). 

Artists such as Akram Khan, Sidi Larbi Cherkaoui, Ryoji Ikeda, Meng Jinghui, Melati Suryodarmo and Teater Garasi have all presented Australian premieres at the OzAsia Festival.

In May 2020 Annette Shun Wah was appointed director of the festival, taking over from Joseph Mitchell. 

The festival in November 2020 was cancelled owing to the COVID-19 pandemic in South Australia. In 2021 it went ahead from 21 October to 7 November, though some shows were cancelled due to COVID-19. It was reported that festival organisers also cancelled the participation of the Hong Kong Cultural Association of South Australia due to its use of yellow umbrellas, a symbol of the 2014 Umbrella Movement.

Events
The Moon Lantern Parade is a free public event and an integral part of OzAsia Festival that celebrates the Mid-Autumn Festival, which is an official harvest festival traditionally celebrated by the Chinese and Vietnamese. The Moon Lantern parade begins after sunset, and is followed by fireworks over the River Torrens.

OzAsia films are shown at the Mercury Cinema in Morphett Street.

In 2015, Adelaide's Riverbank Precinct was transformed for the first time into a hawker-style market with Asian food, themed bars, roving entertainers and free performances every night of the OzAsia Festival. The Adelaide Night Noodle Markets featured for the first time in 2015 at the Adelaide Festival Centre Precinct as part of OzAsia Festival. For eleven nights, patrons were able to sample Asian cuisine from the variety of Asian food stalls. It was the first time the Night Noodle Markets have run in South Australia, following successes in Brisbane, Sydney and Melbourne.

In 2016, OzAsia Festival presented a special outdoor live music concert series in the riverbank precinct's Elder Park to celebrate its 10-year anniversary. The free event ran for ten days and featured top international performers from across Asia.

In 2017, the team behind Adelaide Fringe's "Gluttony" venue hub created and presented The Lucky Dumpling Market for the 2017 OzAsia Festival, which was located on the Adelaide Riverbank Lawns beside the Riverbank Footbridge. The Lucky Dumpling Market showcased authentic Asian cuisine, market stalls, premium wines and beers, and played host to local and international musicians.

For the first time in 2018, OzAsia Festival hosted the South-Asian institution Jaipur Literature Festival, the world's largest free literary festival. In 2021, OzAsia Festival hosted "In Other Words", an in-person event that shifted to a predominantly digital focus due to COVID-19 restrictions. 

In 2022 OzAsia Festival celebrated its 15th year with more than 175,000 attendances across ticketed and free events. This year’s program, under the artistic direction of Annette Shun Wah, featured more than 500 community, national and international artists from 8 countries, and included 10 world premieres, one Australian premiere and seven Adelaide premieres.

Awards and nominations

References

External links

Arts festivals in Australia
Festivals in Adelaide
2007 establishments in Australia
Annual events in Australia
Spring (season) events in Australia